Los Angeles City Council District 3 is one of the 15 districts of the Los Angeles City Council.  It covers some of the westernmost areas of Los Angeles, in the southwestern San Fernando Valley.  Its current representative is Councilmember Bob Blumenfield, who took office on 1 July 2013. The preceding representative was Dennis Zine.

Geography

Present district

The Third District extends to the western boundary of both Los Angeles City and Los Angeles County, bordering Ventura County.  To the east, it ends at White Oak and Lindley Avenue.  It includes the neighborhoods of Woodland Hills, Tarzana, Reseda, Winnetka and Canoga Park.

For all the neighborhoods represented in the district, see the official City of Los Angeles map of District 3.

Historical locations
A new city charter effective in 1925 replaced the former "at large" voting system for a nine-member council with a district system with a 15-member council. Each district was to be approximately equal in population, based upon the voting in the previous gubernatorial election; thus redistricting was done every four years. (At present, redistricting is done every ten years, based upon the preceding U.S. census results.) The numbering system established in 1925 for City Council districts began with No. 1 in the north of the city, the San Fernando Valley, and ended with No. 15 in the south, the Harbor area.

The rough boundaries or descriptions of the Third District have been as follows:

1925: Mostly south of the Santa Monica Mountains east of Sawtelle, with its eastern boundary at Western Avenue, and its southern boundary running along Washington Boulevard to embrace the Palms area. It included the Los Angeles Country Club and the Sawtelle district, and all the Santa Monica Mountains west of Sawtelle to the Ventura County line, including Pacific Palisades and Topanga Canyon.

1926: The "West Washington area."

1928: "The north boundary . . . is the crest of the Santa Monica Mountains and the west boundary the city limits. The Pacific Ocean is the westerly portion of the south boundary of the district, then the line runs southeast along the city limits of Santa Monica to Cambridge Street, south to Pico Boulevard, southeast on Manning avenue and easterly in an irregular line to Eighth Street and Western Avenue. The line runs north on Western avenue to Melrose avenue. . . ."

1932-33: "Due to its size, much territory was taken from this district. Its new boundaries are south by Pico Boulevard, east by Highland Avenue, north by Hollywood Hills, extending west to the ocean and Santa Monica Canyon."

1937: Between the Pacific Ocean on the west and Sycamore Avenue on the east, north of Pico Boulevard.

1940: Irregularly shaped east-west district including the area south of West Hollywood and Beverly Hills, with Westwood, Brentwood and Pacific Palisades, to the coast.

1951: "West Hollywood, UCLA and contiguous territory and then ventures over the Santa Monica Mountains to take in a portion of the San Fernando Valley, including Tarzana, Woodland Hills and other communities."

1960. The 3rd District gave up Encino and part of  Woodland Hills.

1964: The district was reduced in size when the 12th District was transferred from Downtown Los Angeles to the San Fernando Valley, taking over some of the 3rd's area.

1965: The southwest corner of the Valley, including Woodland Hills, Tarzana and parts of Encino, Canoga Park and Reseda.

1981. "Although the district is largely white and middle class, it is complicated and anything but homogenous. A study in contrasts, it has expensive ranch homes in Woodland Hills that are minutes away from shack-like dwellings in Canoga Park, a largely Hispanic barrio dating from the early 1900s."

1985: Canoga Park, West Hills (now in District 12), Reseda, west Van Nuys and parts of Tarzana and Woodland Hills.

Population

Council District 3 has a population of 261,577 people. There are 90,765 households with an average size of 2.86 persons per household, according to a 2012 City of Los Angeles report on economic policy.

The median household income in 2012 was $57,257.  Per capita income for the district was $28,341. 10.8% of households earn an income below the poverty level.

38.2% of the population are Latino.  The racial makeup of the district is: 60.3% White, 17.4% other race, 11.9% Asian, 5.2% two or more races, and 4.5% Black.

Officeholders

Eleven men and two women have represented this district.

See also
 Los Angeles City Council districts
 List of Los Angeles municipal election returns

References

Note: Access to most Los Angeles Times reference links requires the use of an LAPL library card.

External links
 Official Los Angeles City Council District 3 website
 City of Los Angeles: Map of District 3

LACD03
LACD03
Canoga Park, Los Angeles
Reseda, Los Angeles
Tarzana, Los Angeles
Winnetka, Los Angeles
Woodland Hills, Los Angeles
LACD03
LACD03
LACD03